The 2010–11 Washington Wizards season is the 50th season of the Washington Wizards franchise in the National Basketball Association (NBA), the 38th in the Washington, D.C. area. This was also the last season the Wizards's color scheme was Blue and gold. Also, their DC logo was changed to include a mashup with the Bullets's "Hands" logo.

Key dates
 June 24 - The 2010 NBA Draft was held in New York City.
 July 1 - The free agency period begun.

Summary

NBA Draft 2010

Roster

Pre-season

Game log

|- bgcolor="##bc9b6a"
| 1
| October 5
| @ Dallas
| 
| Andray Blatche (22)
| Yi Jianlian (10)
| John Wall (9)
| American Airlines Center15,546
| 1–0
|- bgcolor="#ccffcc"
| 2
| October 7
| @ Cleveland
| 
| Yi Jianlian (16)
| Yi Jianlian,Andray Blatche (7)
| John Wall (9)
| Quicken Loans Arena19,124
| 2–0
|- bgcolor="#ffcccc"
| 3
| October 8
| @ Chicago
| 
| Nick Young (18)
| JaVale McGee (5)
| John Wall (6)
| United Center20,898
| 2–1
|- bgcolor="#ccffcc"
| 4
| October 12
| Atlanta
| 
| Nick Young (24)
| JaVale McGee (11)
| Kirk Hinrich (8)
| Verizon Center9,230
| 3–1
|- bgcolor="#ffcccc"
| 5
| October 14
| Milwaukee
| 
| Andray Blatche (17)
| Andray Blatche (9)
| John Wall (11)
| Verizon Center9,263
| 3–2
|- bgcolor="#ffcccc"
| 6
| October 17
| @ New York
| 
| John Wall (19)
| Kirk Hinrich (9)
| John Wall (6)
| Madison Square Garden18,792
| 3–3
|- bgcolor="#ffcccc"
| 7
| October 19
| @ Detroit
| 
| Andray Blatche,Kirk Hinrich (17)
| Trevor Booker (12)
| John Wall (7)
| Huntington Center6,424
| 3–4
|-

Regular season

Standings

Record vs. opponents

Game log

|- bgcolor="#ffcccc"
| 1
| October 28
| @ Orlando
| 
| Cartier Martin (17)
| Al Thornton (7)
| John Wall (9)
| Amway Center18,918
| 0–1
|- bgcolor="#ffcccc"
| 2
| October 30
| @ Atlanta
| 
| John Wall (28)
| JaVale McGee (8)
| John Wall (9)
| Philips Arena18,729
| 0–2

|- bgcolor="#ccffcc"
| 3
| November 2
| Philadelphia
| 
| John Wall (29)
| Andray Blatche (8)
| John Wall (13)
| Verizon Center17,803
| 1–2
|- bgcolor="#ffcccc"
| 4
| November 5
| @ New York
| 
| Andray Blatche (22)
| JaVale McGee (8)
| John Wall (7)
| Madison Square Garden19,763
| 1–3
|- bgcolor="#ffcccc"
| 5
| November 6
| Cleveland
| 
| Al Thornton (23)
| Andray Blatche (15)
| John Wall (10)
| Verizon Center14,442
| 1–4
|- bgcolor="#ccffcc"
| 6
| November 10
| Houston
| 
| Andray Blatche,Al Thornton (20)
| Andray Blatche (11)
| John Wall (13)
| Verizon Center13,665
| 2–4
|- bgcolor="#ffcccc"
| 7
| November 12
| Charlotte
| 
| Andray Blatche (22)
| Andray Blatche (9)
| John Wall (11)
| Verizon Center14,855
| 2–5
|- bgcolor="#ffcccc"
| 8
| November 13
| @ Chicago
| 
| Gilbert Arenas (30)
| Hilton Armstrong (10)
| Kirk Hinrich,John Wall (6)
| United Center21,610
| 2–6
|- bgcolor="#ccffcc"
| 9
| November 16
| Toronto
| 
| Andray Blatche (22)
| JaVale McGee (9)
| Kirk Hinrich (12)
| Verizon Center11,513
| 3–6
|- bgcolor="#ffcccc"
| 10
| November 17
| @ Boston
| 
| Nick Young (20)
| JaVale McGee (10)
| Kirk Hinrich (5)
| TD Garden18,624
| 3–7
|- bgcolor="#ccffcc"
| 11
| November 19
| Memphis
| 
| Gilbert Arenas (24)
| JaVale McGee (12)
| Kirk Hinrich (6)
| Verizon Center13,504
| 4–7
|- bgcolor="#ffcccc"
| 12
| November 21
| @ Detroit
| 
| Andray Blatche,JaVale McGee (20)
| JaVale McGee (16)
| Gilbert Arenas (16)
| The Palace of Auburn Hills13,241
| 4–8
|- bgcolor="#ccffcc"
| 13
| November 23
| Philadelphia
| 
| John Wall (25)
| JaVale McGee (18)
| Gilbert Arenas (7)
| Verizon Center16,197
| 5–8
|- bgcolor="#ffcccc"
| 14
| November 25
| @ Atlanta
| 
| Gilbert Arenas (21)
| JaVale McGee (10)
| Gilbert Arenas (8)
| Philips Arena15,042
| 5–9
|- bgcolor="#ffcccc"
| 15
| November 27
| Orlando
| 
| Gilbert Arenas (31)
| Andray Blatche (13)
| Gilbert Arenas (5)
| Verizon Center16,435
| 5–10
|- bgcolor="#ffcccc"
| 16
| November 29
| @ Miami
| 
| Andray Blatche (26)
| JaVale McGee (10)
| Gilbert Arenas (7)
| American Airlines Arena19,600
| 5–11

|- bgcolor="#ffcccc"
| 17
| December 1
| @ Toronto
| 
| JaVale McGee (21)
| JaVale McGee (7)
| John Wall (8)
| Air Canada Centre15,209
| 5–12
|- bgcolor="#ccffcc"
| 18
| December 3
| Portland
| 
| Andray Blatche (19)
| JaVale McGee (10)
| Gilbert Arenas (6)
| Verizon Center13,408
| 6–12
|- bgcolor="#ffcccc"
| 19
| December 5
| @ Phoenix
| 
| Andray Blatche (24)
| Yi Jianlian (9)
| John Wall (12)
| US Airways Center17,430
| 6–13
|- bgcolor="#ffcccc"
| 20
| December 7
| @ L.A. Lakers
| 
| Nick Young (30)
| JaVale McGee (6)
| John Wall (14)
| Staples Center18,997
| 6–14
|- bgcolor="#ffcccc"
| 21
| December 8
| @ Sacramento
| 
| Al Thornton (20)
| JaVale McGee (9)
| Gilbert Arenas (4)
| ARCO Arena12,308
| 6–15
|- bgcolor="#ffcccc"
| 22
| December 10
| New York
| 
| Gilbert Arenas (20)
| JaVale McGee (10)
| Gilbert Arenas,John Wall (6)
| Verizon Center18,542
| 6–16
|- bgcolor="#ffcccc"
| 23
| December 14
| L.A. Lakers
| 
| Nick Young (21)
| Trevor Booker,JaVale McGee,Kevin Seraphin (9)
| Gilbert Arenas (10)
| Verizon Center16,513
| 6–17
|- bgcolor="#ffcccc"
| 24
| December 16
| @ New Jersey
| 
| Nick Young (22)
| Trevor Booker (9)
| Gilbert Arenas (9)
| Prudential Center10,764
| 6–18
|- bgcolor="#ffcccc"
| 25
| December 18
| Miami
| 
| Nick Young (30)
| Andray Blatche (12)
| Kirk Hinrich (12)
| Verizon Center20,278
| 6–19
|- bgcolor="#ccffcc"
| 26
| December 20
| Charlotte
| 
| Nick Young (21)
| Kirk Hinrich (6)
| Kirk Hinrich (11)
| Verizon Center13,825
| 7–19
|- bgcolor="#ffcccc"
| 27
| December 22
| Chicago
| 
| Nick Young (22)
| JaVale McGee (10)
| Kirk Hinrich (9)
| Verizon Center18,011
| 7–20
|- bgcolor="#ffcccc"
| 28
| December 26
| @ San Antonio
| 
| Rashard Lewis (21)
| Hilton Armstrong (13)
| Kirk Hinrich (7)
| AT&T Center18,581
| 7–21
|- bgcolor="#ffcccc"
| 29
| December 27
| @ Houston
| 
| Kirk Hinrich (19)
| Andray Blatche (14)
| John Wall (6)
| Toyota Center18,143
| 7–22
|- bgcolor="#ccffcc"
| 30
| December 29
| Indiana
| 
| Nick Young (25)
| Andray Blatche (11)
| John Wall (12)
| Verizon Center16,108
| 8–22
|- bgcolor="#ffcccc"
| 31
| December 31
| @ Indiana
| 
| John Wall (25)
| Andray Blatche (12)
| Rashard Lewis (5)
| Conseco Fieldhouse13,043
| 8–23

|- bgcolor="#ffcccc"
| 32
| January 1
| New Orleans
| 
| Nick Young (24)
| JaVale McGee (13)
| John Wall (10)
| Verizon Center16,026
| 8–24
|- bgcolor="#ffcccc"
| 33
| January 5
| @ Philadelphia
| 
| Nick Young (21)
| Rashard Lewis (10)
| John Wall (14)
| Wells Fargo Center12,434
| 8–25
|- bgcolor="#ccffcc"
| 34
| January 7
| New Jersey
| 
| Rashard Lewis,Nick Young (16)
| Rashard Lewis (13)
| John Wall (9)
| Verizon Center16,017
| 9–25
|- bgcolor="#ffcccc"
| 35
| January 8
| @ Charlotte
| 
| Kirk Hinrich (18)
| Andray Blatche (8)
| John Wall (11)
| Time Warner Cable Arena16,038
| 9–26
|- bgcolor="#ccffcc"
| 36
| January 11
| Sacramento
| 
| Nick Young (43)
| Andray Blatche (13)
| John Wall (9)
| Verizon Center16,226
| 10–26
|- bgcolor="#ffcccc"
| 37
| January 13
| @ Minnesota
| 
| Rashard Lewis (19)
| Yi Jianlian (8)
| John Wall (10)
| Target Center11,437
| 10–27
|- bgcolor="#ccffcc"
| 38
| January 15
| Toronto
| 
| Nick Young (29)
| Andray Blatche (13)
| John Wall (9)
| Verizon Center14,652
| 11–27
|- bgcolor="#ccffcc"
| 39
| January 17
| Utah
| 
| Nick Young (25)
| Andray Blatche,JaVale McGee (11)
| John Wall (15)
| Verizon Center14,925
| 12–27
|- bgcolor="#ffcccc"
| 40
| January 19
| @ Milwaukee
| 
| Andray Blatche (23)
| Andray Blatche (7)
| John Wall (13)
| Bradley Center14,007
| 12–28
|- bgcolor="#ffcccc"
| 41
| January 21
| Phoenix
| 
| Nick Young (25)
| Rashard Lewis (12)
| John Wall (14)
| Verizon Center15,716
| 12–29
|- bgcolor="#ccffcc"
| 42
| January 22
| Boston
| 
| Rashard Lewis (18)
| Rashard Lewis (11)
| Mustafa Shakur (5)
| Verizon Center20,278
| 13–29
|- bgcolor="#ffcccc"
| 43
| January 24
| @ New York
| 
| Nick Young (22)
| JaVale McGee (10)
| John Wall (9)
| Madison Square Garden19,763
| 13–30
|- bgcolor="#ffcccc"
| 44
| January 25
| Denver
| 
| Nick Young (26)
| Andray Blatche (9)
| John Wall (13)
| Verizon Center16,121
| 13–31
|- bgcolor="#ffcccc"
| 45
| January 28
| @ Oklahoma City
| 
| Nick Young (32)
| Trevor Booker (12)
| John Wall (10)
| Oklahoma City Arena18,203
| 13–32
|- bgcolor="#ffcccc"
| 46
| January 29
| @ Memphis
| 
| John Wall (14)
| Trevor Booker (12)
| John Wall (8)
| FedExForum14,722
| 13–33
|- bgcolor="#ffcccc"
| 47
| January 31
| @ Dallas
| 
| Rashard Lewis,Nick Young (18)
| Andray Blatche (13)
| John Wall (10)
| American Airlines Center19,724
| 13–34

|- bgcolor="#ffcccc"
| 48
| February 1
| @ New Orleans
| 
| Nick Young (30)
| Andray Blatche (9)
| John Wall (7)
| New Orleans Arena13,921
| 13–35
|- bgcolor="#ffcccc"
| 49
| February 4
| Orlando
| 
| Kirk Hinrich,Nick Young (17)
| Rashard Lewis (8)
| Andray Blatche (6)
| Verizon Center18,940
| 13–36
|- bgcolor="#ffcccc"
| 50
| February 5
| Atlanta
| 
| Nick Young (21)
| Andray Blatche,John Wall (6)
| John Wall (6)
| Verizon Center16,256
| 13–37
|- bgcolor="#ccffcc"
| 51
| February 9
| Milwaukee
| 
| Nick Young (26)
| JaVale McGee (17)
| John Wall (6)
| Verizon Center16,108
| 14–37
|- bgcolor="#ffcccc"
| 52
| February 12
| San Antonio
| 
| Andray BlatcheCartier Martin (16)
| Andray Blatche (9)
| John Wall (7)
| Verizon Center20,435
| 14–38
|- bgcolor="#ccffcc"
| 53
| February 13
| @ Cleveland
| 
| Nick Young (31)
| Andray Blatche (9)
| John Wall (14)
| Quicken Loans Arena19,154
| 15–38
|- bgcolor="#ffcccc"
| 54
| February 16
| @ Orlando
| 
| John Wall (27)
| Andray Blatche (9)
| Kirk Hinrich (3)
| Amway Center19,054
| 15–39
|- align="center"
|colspan="9" bgcolor="#bbcaff"|All-Star Break
|- bgcolor="#ffcccc"
| 55
| February 22
| Indiana
| 
| Andray Blatche (21)
| JaVale McGee,John Wall (8)
| John Wall (10)
| Verizon Center14,328
| 15–40
|- bgcolor="#ffcccc"
| 56
| February 23
| @ Philadelphia
| 
| Trevor Booker,John Wall (21)
| Josh Howard (6)
| John Wall (12)
| Wells Fargo Center12,704
| 15–41
|- bgcolor="#ffcccc"
| 57
| February 25
| @ Miami
| 
| Nick Young (38)
| JaVale McGee (17)
| John Wall (12)
| American Airlines Arena19,825
| 15–42
|- bgcolor="ffcccc"
| 58
| February 26
| Dallas
| 
| John Wall (24)
| JaVale McGee (11)
| John Wall (5)
| Verizon Center19,203
| 15–43
|- bgcolor="#ffcccc"
| 59
| February 28
| Chicago
| 
| Andray Blatche (15)
| Andray Blatche (11)
| John Wall (10)
| Verizon Center17,873
| 15–44

|- bgcolor="#ffcccc"
| 60
| March 2
| Golden State
| 
| Nick Young (31)
| Trevor Booker (11)
| Andray Blatche,John Wall (6)
| Verizon Center17,865
| 15–45
|- bgcolor="#ccffcc"
| 61
| March 5
| Minnesota
| 
| Andray Blatche (20)
| John Wall (11)
| John Wall (8)
| Verizon Center18,216
| 16–45
|- bgcolor="#ffcccc"
| 62
| March 6
| @ Detroit
| 
| John Wall (24)
| Andray Blatche (9)
| John Wall (7)
| The Palace of Auburn Hills17,506
| 16–46
|- bgcolor="#ffcccc"
| 63
| March 8
| Milwaukee
| 
| Jordan Crawford (22)
| JaVale McGee (13)
| John Wall (7)
| Verizon Center16,190
| 16–47
|- bgcolor="#ffcccc"
| 64
| March 12
| L.A. Clippers
| 
| John Wall (25)
| JaVale McGee (8)
| John Wall (8)
| Verizon Center20,278
| 16–48
|- bgcolor="#ffcccc"
| 65
| March 14
| Oklahoma City
| 
| Trevor Booker,JaVale McGee,John Wall (14)
| Trevor Booker (13)
| Jordan Crawford,John Wall (5)
| Verizon Center17,921
| 16–49
|- bgcolor="#ffcccc"
| 66
| March 15
| @ Chicago
| 
| Jordan Crawford (27)
| JaVale McGee (12)
| John Wall (7)
| United Center22,103
| 16–50
|- bgcolor="#ffcccc"
| 67
| March 18
| @ Toronto
| 
| Trevor Booker (26)
| Trevor Booker (13)
| John Wall (7)
| Air Canada Centre18,017
| 16–51
|- bgcolor="#ccffcc"
| 68
| March 20
| New Jersey
| 
| John Wall (26)
| Trevor Booker (8)
| John Wall (8)
| Verizon Center17,761
| 17–51
|- bgcolor="#ffcccc"
| 69
| March 22
| @ Portland
| 
| Jordan Crawford (12)
| JaVale McGee (7)
| John Wall (7)
| Rose Garden20,624
| 17–52
|- bgcolor="#ffcccc"
| 70
| March 23
| @ L.A. Clippers
| 
| John Wall (32)
| JaVale McGee (13)
| Jordan Crawford,John Wall (10)
| Staples Center19,060
| 17–53
|- bgcolor="#ffcccc"
| 71
| March 25
| @ Denver
| 
| Jordan Crawford (19)
| JaVale McGee (13)
| John Wall (6)
| Pepsi Center19,308
| 17–54
|- bgcolor="#ffcccc"
| 72
| March 27
| @ Golden State
| 
| JaVale McGee (28)
| JaVale McGee (18)
| John Wall (12)
| Oracle Arena17,723
| 17–55
|- bgcolor="#ccffcc"
| 73
| March 28
| @ Utah
| 
| John Wall (28)
| JaVale McGee (17)
| John Wall (7)
| EnergySolutions Arena19,724
| 18–55
|- bgcolor="#ffcccc"
| 74
| March 30
| Miami
| 
| Jordan Crawford (39)
| Andray Blatche,Othyus Jeffers (8)
| John Wall (5)
| Verizon Center18,916
| 18–56

|- bgcolor="#ccffcc"
| 75
| April 1
| Cleveland
| 
| Andray Blatche (36)
| Andray Blatche (19)
| Jordan Crawford (11)
| Verizon Center17,427
| 19–56
|- bgcolor="#ccffcc"
| 76
| April 3
| @ Charlotte
| 
| Andray Blatche (25)
| Andray Blatche (17)
| John Wall (5)
| Time Warner Cable Arena16,444
| 20–56
|- bgcolor="#ccffcc"
| 77
| April 5
| Detroit
| 
| Andray Blatche,John Wall (26)
| Andray Blatche (10)
| John Wall (12)
| Verizon Center18,131
| 21–56
|- bgcolor="#ffcccc"
| 78
| April 6
| @ Indiana
| 
| Jordan Crawford (29)
| Andray Blatche (10)
| John Wall (4)
| Conseco Fieldhouse14,222
| 21–57
|- bgcolor="#ffcccc"
| 79
| April 8
| @ Boston
| 
| Andray Blatche,John Wall (20)
| Andray Blatche,JaVale McGee (10)
| John Wall (7)
| TD Garden18,624
| 21–58
|- bgcolor="#ccffcc"
| 80
| April 9
| Atlanta
| 
| Andray Blatche (23)
| Othyus Jeffers (11)
| Jordan Crawford (8)
| Verizon Center19,771
| 22–58
|- bgcolor="#ccffcc"
| 81
| April 11
| Boston
| 
| John Wall (24)
| Yi Jianlian (10)
| Jordan Crawford (6)
| Verizon Center17,787
| 23–58
|- bgcolor="#ffcccc"
| 82
| April 13
| @ Cleveland
| 
| Andray Blatche (20)
| Yi Jianlian (12)
| Jordan Crawford (6)
| Quicken Loans Arena20,562
| 23–59
|-

Player statistics

Season

Awards, records and milestones

Awards

Week/Month
 On February 1, 2011 John Wall was named Eastern Conference's Rookie of the Month for January.
 On March 1, 2011 John Wall was named Eastern Conference's Rookie of the Month for February.
 On April 1, 2011 John Wall was named Eastern Conference's Rookie of the Month for March.

All-Star

Season

Records
 The Wizards became the only NBA team to have two rookies, John Wall and Jordan Crawford, each record triple-doubles in a single season.

Milestones

Transactions

Trades

Free agents

Additions

Subtractions

|}

References

Washington Wizards seasons
Washington
Wash
Wash